Galchhi (Nepali: गल्छी; galchhi) is a Gaupalika(Nepali: गाउपालिका ; gaupalika) Formerly: village development committee) in Dhading District in the Bagmati Province of central Nepal. The local body was formed by merging three VDCs namely Baireni, Kalleri and Goganpani (Ward No. 1,2,3,9). Currently, it has a total of 8 wards. The population of the rural municipality is 27784 according to the data collected on 2017 Nepalese local elections.

Demographics
At the time of the 2011 Nepal census, Galchhi Rural Municipality had a population of 26,215. Of these, 78.5% spoke Nepali, 19.0% Tamang, 1.0% Magar, 0.3% Bhojpuri, 0.3% Newar, 0.2% Hindi, 0.1% Gurung, 0.1% Maithili, 0.1% Sherpa, 0.1% Urdu and 0.1% other languages as their first language.

In terms of ethnicity/caste, 22.4% were Tamang, 18.4% Hill Brahmin, 14.5% Chhetri, 12.2% Magar, 9.0% Sarki, 7.9% Newar, 5.2% Kami, 3.1% Gharti/Bhujel, 2.5% Damai/Dholi, 1.1% Danuwar, 1.0% Thakuri, 0.5% Musalman, 0.4% Majhi, 0.4% Sanyasi/Dasnami, 0.3% Kamar, 0.3% Rai, 0.2% Gurung, 0.1% other Dalit, 0.1% Sherpa, 0.1% Tharu and 0.4% others.

In terms of religion, 79.0% were Hindu, 19.3% Buddhist, 1.1% Christian, 0.5% Muslim and 0.1% others.

In terms of literacy, 64.8% could both read and write, 2.4% could read but not write and 32.7% could neither read nor write.

Geography 
East: Thakre and Nuwakot District

West: Gajuri and Siddhalek Gaupalika

North: Niklantha, Nepal and Nuwakot District

South: Gajuri, Thakre Gaupalika and Makawanpur District

Population 
As per 2017, Galchhi hosts a population of 27,784 across a total area of 129.08 km2.

See also
Dhading District

References

Populated places in Dhading District
Rural municipalities in Dhading District
Rural municipalities of Nepal established in 2017